Line Walker 2: Invisible Spy is a 2019 action thriller film. It is adapted from the 2014 TVB series of the same name and serves as a sequel to the 2016 film Line Walker. Directed by Jazz Boon, the film stars Nick Cheung, Louis Koo and Francis Ng.  All major characters in the film are different from the original drama series and the first film. It was released in Hong Kong and Mainland China on 7 August 2019 and the US on 16 August 2019.

Plot
An international terrorist organization abducted many children, turning them into spies to work at various police forces around the world. After Superintendent Yip (Francis Ng) and Chief Inspector Ching (Nick Cheung) arrested a female hacker named Yiu (Jiang Pei yao) who was about to piece together the schemes of the organization, Superintendent Cheng (Louis Koo) tried to take the case off their hands. Who could be the double agents? They went to Myanmar and Navarre to find out the truth, but soon there are blurred lines between good cops vs bad cops.

Cast
Nick Cheung as CIB Chief Inspector Ching
Louis Koo as  Security Wing Superintendent Cheng 
Francis Ng as CIB Superintendent Yip
Jiang Peiyao as  Journalist/Hacker Yiu 
Joe Ma as Commissioner of HK Police
Huang Zhizhong as Mr. Tung
Benjamin Yuen as Ah John – Cheng's subordinate
Joel Chan as Chief Superintendent Leung
Zhang Yichi as Demon, Henchman of Mr. Tung
 Liu Yuning as Bill.

Cameos
Au Siu-wai as Businessman 
Grace Wong as CIB detective
Kaman Kong as CIB detective
Bowie Cheung as CIB detective
Chloe Yuen as nanny of Superintendent Cheng's daughter
Guillermo Larrayoz as Zaldiko

Reception
The film has  rating on Rotten Tomatoes based on  reviews.

References

External links

Hong Kong action films
Chinese crime drama films
Chinese action films
Shaw Brothers Studio films
2010s Cantonese-language films
2010s Mandarin-language films
Films based on television series
Films directed by Jazz Boon